The 2013 election of the Speaker of the New Zealand House of Representatives occurred on 31 January 2013, following the retirement of the previous Speaker Lockwood Smith. The election resulted in the election of National Party MP David Carter.

Nominated candidates
 Hon David Carter, List MP – National Party
 Hon Trevor Mallard, MP for  – Labour Party

Election
The election was conducted by means of a conventional parliamentary motion. The Clerk of the House of Representatives conducted a vote on the question of the election of the Speaker, in accordance with Standing Order 19.

The following table gives the election results:

How each MP voted:

References

Speaker of the House of Representatives election
Speaker of the House of Representatives election
Speaker of the House of Representatives of New Zealand elections